The Medical Services Plan of British Columbia (MSP) is the government-administered, single-payer health insurance in the Canadian province of British Columbia, operating under the auspices of the country's national Medicare program.  Under the Canadian constitution, provinces are responsible for the delivery of health care, while the national Canada Health Act ensures access to universal health care for all citizens of the country.

The plan covers medically required services provided by a physician enrolled with MSP; maternity care provided by a physician or a midwife; medically required eye examinations provided by an ophthalmologist or optometrist; diagnostic services, including x-rays and laboratory services, provided at approved diagnostic facilities, when ordered by a registered physician, midwife, podiatrist, dental surgeon or oral surgeon; dental and oral surgery, when medically required to be performed in hospital; and orthodontic services related to severe congenital facial abnormalities.

MSP claims processing system is integrated with a web-based telecommunications system, Teleplan. Teleplan is used by practitioners to securely submit from over 4,200 computer sites their claims, notes and eligibility requests to MSP, and receive payment statements, rejected claims and patient eligibility data from MSP through an encrypted Internet connection. Teleplan receives and processes over 5 million claims monthly, valued at approximately $116 million. Approximately 95% of all claims are processed within 30 days, with the majority being paid within 14 days.  Billing software is developed for these sites by over 80 software vendors who are registered with MSP. An association called Medical Software Vendors Association (MSVA) is formed by the major vendors to work with MSP for ongoing specifications and method changes. Teleplan was started in late 1980s, went through many specification and technological changes and is MSP's main gateway of medical claim information.
 
As of April 2005, Health Insurance BC is the new name for administrative operations of the Medical Services Plan (MSP) and PharmaCare, including Fair PharmaCare.

On 16 September 2016, Michael de Jong, Minister of Finance for British Columbia announced that the government will  spend $500 million on housing affordability, while also canceling the planned increase in MSP premiums and possibly increase Welfare rates.

There will also be a province-wide database for British Columbians to be matched with a GP. It is expected that  doctors will then earn $385,000, up from an average of $250,000.

See also

British Columbia Ambulance Service
E-Comm, 9-1-1 call and dispatch centre for Southwestern BC
Emergency Social Services
HealthLink BC
List of emergency organizations in British Columbia

References

External links 
 Medical Services Plan of British Columbia

Health in British Columbia